Enrique Javier Cornejo Ramirez (born 2 June 1956) is a Peruvian politician who was the former Minister of Transportation and Communications that was under President Alan García from September 2010 to July 2011. Prior to that, he was the Minister of Housing and Construction.

Biography
Enrique Cornejo graduated from the University of Lima. He has taught at universities in Ecuador and Bolivia. He also taught at the Pontificia Universidad Católica del Perú. From August 2006 to December 2007, he was the CEO of the National Bank of Peru. In 2007, he was appointed the Peruvian Minister of Housing and Construction. In September 2010, he became the Minister of Transportation and Communication.

Candidacy for Mayor of Lima 
In the 2014 municipal elections, he ran for Mayor of Lima under the Peruvian Aprista Party, but lost to Luis Castañeda Lossio.  In April 2017, he announced that he would run again for mayor for the municipal elections of Lima in 2018, founding a provincial organization "Contigo Ciudadano" after his resignation from the Peruvian Aprista Party in March of the same year. By failing to meet the signature requirement, he formed an alliance with the Direct Democracy Party, sealing his candidacy for 2018.

Arrest 
On 17 April 2019, the Peruvian judiciary ordered preliminary detention against him and other investigators, for having received alleged bribes from the Odebrecht company. Subsequently, the former Minister of Transport was detained by the police as he was leaving a media outlet building.

References

Living people
Government ministers of Peru
20th-century Peruvian economists
University of Lima alumni
Academic staff of the Pontifical Catholic University of Peru
1956 births
People from Lima
American Popular Revolutionary Alliance politicians